Klebsiella aerogenes, previously known as Enterobacter aerogenes, is a Gram-negative, oxidase negative, catalase positive, citrate positive, indole negative, rod-shaped bacterium. The bacterium is approximately 1–3 microns in length, and is capable of motility via peritrichous flagella.

Klebsiella aerogenes is a nosocomial and pathogenic bacterium that causes opportunistic infections including most types of infections. The majority are sensitive to most antibiotics designed for this bacteria class, but this is complicated by their inducible resistance mechanisms, particularly lactamase, which means that they quickly become resistant to standard antibiotics during treatment, requiring a change in antibiotic to avoid worsening of the sepsis.

Some of the infections caused by K. aerogenes result from specific antibiotic treatments, venous catheter insertions, and/or surgical procedures. K. aerogenes is generally found in the human gastrointestinal tract and does not generally cause disease in healthy individuals. It has been found to live in various wastes, hygienic chemicals, and soil. The bacterium also has some commercial significance – the hydrogen gas produced during fermentation has been experimented with using molasses as the substrate.

K. aerogenes is an outstanding hydrogen producer. It is an anaerobic facultative and mesophilic bacterium that is able to consume different sugars and in contrast to cultivation of strict anaerobes, no special operation is required to remove all oxygen from the fermenter. K. aerogenes has a short doubling time and high hydrogen productivity and evolution rate. Furthermore, hydrogen production by this bacterium is not inhibited at high hydrogen partial pressures; however, its yield is lower compared to strict anaerobes like Clostridia. A theoretical maximum of 4 mol H2/mol glucose can be produced by strict anaerobic bacteria. Facultative anaerobic bacteria such as K. aerogenes have a theoretical maximum yield of 2 mol H2/mol glucose.

It may spoil maple sap and syrup.

Owing to diverse metabolites, namely acids and alcohols, produced by such a strain in conjunction with its capability of utilizing different sugars, the metabolic behavior and growth of K. aerogenes can significantly vary under different conditions.

Biochemical identification test results

References

External links

Type strain of Klebsiella aerogenes at BacDive -  the Bacterial Diversity Metadatabase

Enterobacteriaceae
Bacteria described in 1960